Herea is a genus of moths in the subfamily Arctiinae. The genus was erected by Francis Walker in 1854.

Species
 Herea abdominalis Gaede, 1926
 Herea metaxanthus Walker, 1854
 Herea prittwitzi Möschler, 1872
 Herea ruficeps Walker, 1854

References

External links

Arctiinae